William Hughes (2 March 1803 – 20 August 1861), was a British writer on law and angling in the 19th century.

Biography
Hughes, born in Maker Vicarage, Cornwall, was the fourth son of Sir Robert Hughes, third baronet, by his second wife, Bethia, daughter of Thomas Hiscutt, and was a nephew of Admiral Sir Richard Hughes. His father, who matriculated from Trinity College, Oxford, on 30 March 1757, aged 17, was a demy of Magdalen College 1758–67, B.A. 1761, M.A. 1763, rector of Frimley St Mary and Weston, Suffolk, from 1769 until his death, and was buried on 4 June 1814.

William was admitted to the bar at Gray's Inn on 11 June 1833, and practised as a conveyancer on the Western Circuit, where he was also auditor of the poor-law union district of Cornwall and Devonshire. He died at Millbay Grove, Plymouth.

Works
Hughes's chief writings were: 
1833: Practical Directions for Taking Instructions for, and Drawing Wills
1840: A Practical Treatise of the Laws Relative to the Sale and Conveyance of Real Property: with an appendix of precedents, comprising contracts, conditions of sale, purchase and disentailing deeds. 2 vols. London: Saunders & Benning
1842: The Practical Angler. By Piscator
1843: Fish, How to Choose, and How to Dress. By Piscator
--do.--2nd edit., 1854, entitled A Practical Treatise on the Choice and Cookery of Fish
1846: The Practice of Sales of Real Property, with an Appendix of Precedents. 2 vols. London: John Crockford, 1846–47
--do.-- 2nd ed. 2 vols. London: John Crockford, 1849–50
1846: The Three Students of Gray's Inn: a novel
1848: The Practice of Mortgages of Real and Personal Estate. 2 vols., London: John Crockford, 1848–49
1850: The New Stamp Act
1850: Concise Precedents in Modern Conveyancing. 3 vols. London: Law Times Office, 1850–53
-- 2nd ed. 3 vols. London: Law Times Office; Dublin: Hodges and Smith, 1855–57
1850: A Table of the Stamp Duties Payable in Great Britain and Ireland
1852: It is All for the Best: a Cornish tale
1856: The Practice of Conveyancing. 2 vols. London: Law Times Office, 1856–57

Notes

References

People from Maker, Cornwall
1803 births
1861 deaths
English writers
19th-century English lawyers
Members of Gray's Inn